Estonian Shooting Sport Federation (abbreviation ESSF) is one of the sport governing bodies in Estonia which deals with Estonian shooting sport. Besides this federation, also Estonian Practical Shooting Association is operating in Estonia.

ESSF is established on 24 March 1931.

ESSF is a member of International Shooting Sport Federation (ISSF).

References

External links
 

Sports governing bodies in Estonia
Shooting sports in Estonia
National members of the European Shooting Confederation
Sports organizations established in 1931